Amina Maher (born as Amin Maher in 1992 in Tehran, Iran) is an Iranian queer artist and filmmaker whose works train her unblinking gaze on the breakdown of family structure, shame culture, and patriarchal myths. Her films have been part of Cannes Film Festival, San Sebastián International Film Festival, Copenhagen International Documentary Film Festival - CPH:DOX, Marseille Festival of Documentary Film - FID Marseille, Feminale - The International Dortmund | Cologne Women's Film Festival and Shorts México among many others.

Biography

Amina Maher began her cinematic activity as the main protagonist in Abbas Kiarostami's Ten, which recorded ten-year-old Amina sitting in the passenger seat of her mother's car without her knowledge. Maher left her family at the age of fifteen and began to live on her own.

Between 2006 and 2012, Maher continued her cinematic activity as an actor, assistant director, and editor to her mother, Mania Akbari, on several films, such as  "10+4" which premiered at Cannes Acid Section and San Sebastián International Film Festival in 2006, as well as "From Tehran to London", premiered in 2013 at International Film Festival Rotterdam. In 2007, she started her filmmaking practices by filming her friends both at school and later at university. She was arrested two days after 2009 Iranian presidential election and had been subjected to serious beatings. The reasons for her arrest were her support to Iranian Green Movement and that she had been identified as an active participant during the presidential campaign.

In 2010 she began her study at University of Tehran. Three months later, she was arrested for the second time due to her political activities and for attending the Student Day demonstration against the dictatorship. This time she spent a week in the notorious Evin prison. Maher subsequently left Iran to Dubai and then to Malaysia.

In 2016, she received her bachelor's degree in filmmaking from Limkokwing University in Malaysia. Her first short film was Cold Wine, followed by Orange and One Window Will Suffice.

Her multi-awarded short film, Letter to My Mother, was well received internationally with +200 festival selections and +50 Awards. The film has been part of Copenhagen International Documentary Film Festival forum as well as the competitions at numerous Int. film festivals such as 36th Kasseler Dokfest, 38th Feminale - The International Dortmund | Cologne Women's Film Festival,  15th Shorts México and 26th Chéries-Chéris (Festival du Film Lesbian, Gay, Bi, Trans & ++++ de Paris). The film is about her own experiences of childhood sexual abuse.

Among numerous reviews, the film was described as avant-garde and moving, a means for survival, a way to stand up and to understand – a fearless and strong examination that touches upon the center of the pain and dares to look precisely. َHer film navigates the vast yet fragile space between self-exploration and family politics within a sociocultural frame.

Letter to My Mother received more than 50 International Awards, such as the Audience Award and the Special Jury Prize at 23rd Indie Memphis Film Festival, USA and Special Jury price at 15th Shorts México and Beirut International Women Film Festival.

Due to directing controversial films, she fled to Germany in 2018. After moving to Berlin in 2019, she started her MA study in Film Directing at Konrad Wolf Film University of Babelsberg.

Letter to My Mother

The film is self-produced, directed, written, performed, and distributed. It has evoked wider social debate, highlighting the need and benefit of survivors and communities being able to speak openly about their own experiences of sexual assault and harassment.

Letter to My Mother won numerous awards and nominations and had been part of the program of more than 100 international film festivals in more than 40 countries. 35th Lovers Film Festival - Torino LGBTQI Visions, 34th Mix Milano Film Festival in Italy, 9th Evolution Mallorca International Film Festival in Spain, and 27th Blue Sea Film Festival in Finland are some of the festivals in which the film was programmed or was nominated for the main award.

The film won more than 50 awards including the special jury prize at 15th Shorts México, Winner of the best film at 16th Davis Feminist Film Festival in the category of The Body & The Self, The Best short Documentary on Human Rights at Venice Intercultural Film Festival and Award of Recognition at Impact Docs Award.

Other Selections and Participations

10th Sicilia Queer filmfest, Italy 
15th Queer Xposed Film Festival, Berlin-Germany 
Broadway Cinematheque, Hong Kong Asian Film Festival, Hong Kong 
12th KASHISH Mumbai International Queer Film Festival, India 
15th Scottish Mental Health Arts Festival, SMHAF, Scotland - Winner of the Best Experimental Film 
9th Evolution Mallorca International Film Festival, Spain (2015) 
Chennai International Queer Film Festival

Reviews

Essays on the political body at 22nd Belo Horizonte International Film Festival, Brazil: In Letter to my mother, Amina Maher conceives a complex montage assembling autobiographical report, epistolary language, archives, and performance. The filmmaker goes through archives of her own therapy sessions and images from the movie, Ten (2002), in which she participated when she was a child, in search of the creation of an autonomous body, one not defined by abuse. One that is free from restraint.

The jury statement at 15th SMHAF: "This is more than just a film. It is an act of courage and radical honesty. It pushes the boundaries in its cinematic discourse on violence, identity, gender, and sexuality; whilst maintaining an unflinching intimacy as the filmmaker shares a long-held secret with her mother and searches for ways of coping and moving forward."
 
Dutch Culture: Within the multifarious strands of filmmaking practice, Maher's filmmaking uses trauma therapy as a theme and it is characterized by a few key factors: its an autoethnographic approach, a desire for honest self-examination, and a play with notions of cinema, reality and life. As the direct victim of abuse, she gave an insight into an experience that is impossible to imagine.

#MeToo movement in Iran and Interview with Iran International 
In November 2019, Amina Maher finished her debut short film, Letter to My Mother which stems from her own experience of childhood sexual abuse. On 25 August, the Persian TV channel, Iran International interviewed Maher, where she came forward publicly that a family member had raped her over a four years period. With this interview, she had also her coming out as a trans woman in Persian-speaking media, which was followed by a large number of insults, transphobic comments, haters, and attacks on social media. Maher's appearance rarely had been seen on Persian-language TV before.

Life and other activities

When Maher was a child, her real-life relationship with her mother, Mania Akbari was featured in the movie, Ten. Four years after that, Maher performed the main role in Mania Akbari's 10+4, a continuation of the movie Ten which followed Akbari's battle with breast cancer. "10+4" screened at Cannes International Film Festival and San Sebastián International Film Festival amongst many other festivals and received critical praise. Afterwards, Maher followed her film activities as an actress, editor and assistant director to her mother, Mania Akbari on "6 Video Arts"  and "From Tehran to London".

In 2010, Maher began studying at Tehran University. Two months later she was arrested due to her political activities and for attending the Student Day demonstration. She subsequently left Iran to study filmmaking at Limkokwing University in Malaysia and directed several short films. Her first fictional short film, Sweet Gin and Cold Wine was nominated for the best short film at the 21st Oldenburg International Film Festival in Germany  and won an award of recognition at the Creative Open International Film Festival (IOFF) in 2016.

In November 2019, Maher finished her documentary film, Letter to My Mother which stems from her own experience of childhood sexual abuse. The film opens up a cinematic discourse about anger, repression, violence and identity. Letter to My Mother was described as a fearless and strong examination that chooses a radically intimate perspective. It is an examination that touches upon the center of the pain and dares to look precisely. It finds exact scenes for despair and cruelty and searches openly for ways of coping.

Maher is also a Persian Performer, Speaker, Porn Maker, and Queer Activist. Between 2019 and 2022, she participated in numerous seminars, talks, and panel discussions about sexual violence and liberation, transness and body politics. Notably, her interview with Iran International was anarchistic, progressive, and moving. It deconstructed the mass media in many ways, including normalizing trans and queer bodies and identities. Her interview was followed by a mass attack on her on social media. Within the same period of time, she got involved in several cases of sexual violence, supporting the cis women survivors. Her activism is about decolonizing the body and gender, encouraging herself and her environment to embrace vulnerability, and reclaiming bodies, care, and pleasure. Maher twists pain into art and joy. Similarly, she finds new questions about love concerning the experiences of abuse as two matters that can't co-exist.

Artworks

As an actress/actor 
Ten (2002, Herself-Protagonist)
Repression (2004) (Video Art)
Escape (2004) (Video Art)
10 + 4 (2007)
Sweet Gin and Cold Wine (2014)
Orange (2015) 
Letter to My Mother (2019, Herself)

As a director 
Sweet Gin and Cold Wine (2014)
Orange (2015) 
Letter to My Mother (2019)

As an Editor 
Letter to My Mother (2019)
A Moon for my Father (2020)

Book 
Start counting from eleven (Poem, 2013)

References

External links
 
 

1992 births
Living people
Iranian actors
Persian-language film directors
Iranian screenwriters
Iranian film directors
Iranian film producers
Iranian film editors
People from Tehran
Poets from Tehran
Iranian LGBT artists
Transgender artists